Particle density may refer to:

 Particle density (packed density), density of material that particles are composed of
 Particle density (particle count), average number of particles in unit volume or unit area

See also 
 Number density